Katerine Martineau is a Canadian film director and screenwriter from Quebec, whose short film Girls Shouldn't Walk Alone at Night (Les filles ne marchent pas seules la nuit) won the Canadian Screen Award for Best Live Action Short Drama at the 10th Canadian Screen Awards in 2022.

A graduate of the Mel Hoppenheim School of Cinema at Concordia University, her student film Waiting for Lou (En attendant Lou) was selected as Concordia's submission to the student film competition at the Festival du nouveau cinéma in 2017, and won the award for best student film at the Canada's Top Ten festival in 2018.

References

External links

21st-century Canadian screenwriters
21st-century Canadian women writers
Canadian women screenwriters
Canadian screenwriters in French
Directors of Genie and Canadian Screen Award winners for Best Live Action Short Drama
Film directors from Quebec
French Quebecers
Concordia University alumni
Living people
Year of birth missing (living people)